Sagephora exsanguis is a species of moth in the family Tineidae. It was described by Alfred Philpott in 1918. This species is endemic to New Zealand and has been found on Cuvier Island, as well as the North and South Islands. The adults of this species are on the wing from October to December.

Taxonomy 

This species was first described by Alfred Philpott in 1918, using specimens collected in Bluff and Dunedin in October, November and December, and named Sagephora exsanguis. In 1928 George Hudson described and illustrated this species in his publication The butterflies and moths of New Zealand. The male holotype specimen, collected in Bluff, is held at the New Zealand Arthropod Collection.

Description

Philpott described this species as follows:

Distribution
This species is endemic to New Zealand and has been collected on the South, North and Cuvier Islands.

Habitat 
This species inhabits native forest as well as wetlands.

Behaviour 
The adults of this species are on the wing from October until December.

Hosts 
This species is associated with Carex species found in wetlands.

References

Moths described in 1918
Tineidae
Moths of New Zealand
Endemic fauna of New Zealand
Taxa named by Alfred Philpott
Endemic moths of New Zealand